The 2008–09 Kent Football League season was the 43rd in the history of Kent Football League a football competition in England.

League table

The league featured 16 clubs which competed in the previous season, along with one new club:
Norton Sports, joined from the Kent County League

League table

Joining and leavings

             
 Corinthian joined Premier Division
 Croydon left from Premier Division
 Fisher joined Premier Division
 Slade Green left from Premier Division
 V C D Athletic left from Premier Division

References

External links

2008-09
9